Ted Southern is an American artist and designer. He is a co-founder of Final Frontier Design and currently lives in Brooklyn, New York, United States.

Biography
Ted Southern, President of Final Frontier Design, artist, and designer, began his career in aerospace by entering the NASA Astronaut Glove Challenge in 2007 as part of his MFA thesis at Pratt Institute. In 2009, Ted and Nik took home a cash prize and created Final Frontier Design from the winnings with Nikolay Moiseev. Ted and Nik used kickstarter to help fund the 3G space suit. Prior to space, Ted's work focused on technical garments for movies, theatre, and television including wings for Victoria's Secret and costumes for Cirque du Soleil.

References

External links
 https://www.kickstarter.com/projects/872281861/final-frontier-designs-3g-space-suit
 http://www.finalfrontierdesign.com/about-ffd/
 https://www.linkedin.com/in/ted-southern-1325074a

Year of birth missing (living people)
Living people
American designers
American male artists
Pratt Institute alumni
Place of birth missing (living people)